, formerly known as , is a stadium in Kameoka, Kyoto Prefecture, Japan. It primarily serves as the home to Kyoto Sanga F.C. of the Japan Professional Football League (J.League). It was completed in early 2020, in time for the 2020 J2 League season.

The naming rights were purchased by ceramic company Kyocera at 2 billion over 20 years in 2019.

References

External links 

  
  
  
  

Sports venues in Kyoto Prefecture
Football venues in Japan
Rugby union stadiums in Japan
American football venues in Japan
Kyoto Sanga FC
Kyocera
Kameoka, Kyoto
Sports venues completed in 2020
2020 establishments in Japan